Ramji Manjhi is an Indian politician. He was elected to the Lok Sabha, lower house of the Parliament of India from Gaya, Bihar in 1999 as a member of the Bharatiya Janata Party.

References

India MPs 1999–2004
Bharatiya Janata Party politicians from Bihar
1954 births
Living people
Lok Sabha members from Bihar
People from Gaya, India